The 1999–2000 Anycall Professional Basketball season was the fourth season of the Korean Basketball League.

Regular season

Playoffs

Prize money
Cheongju SK Knights: KRW 130,000,000 (champions + regular-season 2nd place)
Daejeon Hyundai Gullivers: KRW 100,000,000 (runners-up + regular-season 1st place)
Suwon Samsung Thunders: KRW 20,000,000 (regular-season 3rd place)

External links
Official KBL website (Korean & English)

1999–2000
1999–2000 in South Korean basketball
1999–2000 in Asian basketball leagues